Karl Theodor Saarmann (19 January 1893 Tallinn – 3 April 1948 Tallinn) was an Estonian judge, jurist and politician. He was a member of Estonian National Assembly.

References

1893 births
1948 deaths
Members of the Estonian National Assembly
Estonian jurists
Estonian judges
University of Tartu alumni
Academic staff of the University of Tartu
People from Tallinn
Politicians from Tallinn